was a skilled Japanese Noh actor, troupe leader, and playwright. His plays are particularly characterized by an intricate, allusive, and subtle style inherited from Zeami  which convolved yūgen with influences from Zen Buddhism (his Zen master was Ikkyū) and Kegon. Actors should strive for unconscious performance, in which they enters the "circle of emptiness"; such a state of being is the highest level of artistic or religious achievement.

He lived, worked, and died in the Nara area of Japan. He was trained by Zeami and his son, Motomasa (died 1432), eventually marrying a daughter of Zeami. At some point he took the artistic name Komparu Ujinobu and then finally Komparu Zenchiku. In 1443, he became the leader of the Kanze acting troupe and thus the second successor to Zeami Motokiyo. Zeami passed on his secret teachings to Zenchiku, apparently prompting Zeami's exiling; this refusal to transmit to his blood descendants also prompted a split between the Komparu school and the Kanze. Zenchiku's grandson was Konparu Zenpō, and his descendants would continue to head the Komparu school of Noh.

Works

Attributed writings
Rokurin  ichiro no ki ("A Record of Six Rings and the One Sword"; 六輪一露之記)
Go'on Sangyoku Shū ("Collected Comments on the Five [Feeling] Tones and the Three Performing Modes [Used to Create Them]"; 五音三曲集)

Noh plays

 Bashō ("The Plantain Tree"; 芭蕉)
Eguchi (江口; sometimes credited to Kan'ami and revised by Zeami, or Ikkyu) 
 Kakitsubata ("The Iris"; 杜若; possibly by Zeami)
 Kasuga ryūjin ("The Kasuga Dragon God"; uncertain authorship but attributed to Zenchiku)
 Kogō ("Lady Kogō"; 小督)
 Matsumushi ("The Pine Cricket"; 松虫)
 Mekari (和布刈)
 Oshio (小塩)
 Saoyama (佐保山; Zenchiku?)
 Seiōbo ("Queen Mother of the West"; 西王母)
 Senju (千手 or 千寿)
 Shironushi (代主)
  Shōkun (very uncertain authorship; variously attributed to Zenchiku, Zeami, or neither)
 Shōki (鍾馗)
 Shunkan or Kikaigashima (俊寛 or 鬼界島)
 Tamakazura ("The Jeweled Chaplet"; 玉葛 or 玉鬘)
 Tatsuta (龍田 or 竜田)
 Teika (定家; about the rumored love affair between Fujiwara no Teika and Shikishi Naishinnō)
 Ugetsu ("Rain and Moon"; 雨月)
 Yang Kuei-fei, Yokihi, or Yōkihi (楊貴妃)

Further reading
 Nōgakuron Kenkyū, by Konishi Jin'ichi (Keene commends pgs 240–271 in particular)
 Revealed Identity: The Noh Plays of Komparu Zenchiku (Michigan Monograph Series in Japanese Studies, 55), by Paul S. Atkins. 
 Six Circles, One Dewdrop: The Religio-aesthetic World of Komparu Zenchiku, Arthur H. Thornhill. , 1 June 1993, Princeton University Press
 Traces in the Way: Michi and the Writings of Komparu Zenchiku, Noel J. Pinnington. Published by Cornell University's East Asia Program 30 June 2006; 
 Zeami, Zenchiku (1974), Zeami; Zenchiku Konparu; Akira Omote; Shuichi Katō. 
 "Crossed Paths: Zeami's Transmission to Zenchiku" by Noel J. Pinnington, Monumenta Nipponica, Vol. 52, No. 2. (Summer, 1997), pp. 201–234.
 "Esotericism in noh commentaries and plays: Konparu Zenchiku's Meishuku shu and Kakitsubata," by Susan Blakeley Klein in The culture of secrecy in Japanese religion, Bernhard Scheid; Mark Teeuwen. 
 "Spirituality for the dancer-actor in Zeami's and Zenchiku's writings on the No." Benito Ortolani, 1983–1978; Dance as cultural heritage. Vol. 1. (CORD dance research annual. 14) New York, CORD, c1983. p [147]-158. OCLC: 83163532
 "Was the Author of Ominameshi Komparu Zenchiku?", Haruo Nishino, in "The Noh Ominameshi: A Flower Viewed from Many Directions," Cornell East Asia Series 2003, Vol. 118, pages 209-222, ISSN 1050-2955
 "Zenchiku's Aesthetics of the Nō Theatre", Benito Ortolani
 "Zenchiku's Philosophy of the Noh Drama", by Asaji Nobori, in the 1960 Hiroshima Bunkyō Joshi Daigaku Kenkyū Kiyō.

References

External links
List of Noh plays
Ugetsu synopsis

Noh playwrights
1405 births
1470 deaths
15th-century Japanese male actors